M1134 Anti-Tank Guided Missile Vehicle is a U.S. anti-tank missile carrier that is an armored fighting vehicle from the Stryker family of vehicles. As the primary tank destroyer system of the US Army's Stryker Brigade Combat Team (SBCT), the M1134 ATGM Vehicle reinforces the SBCT's infantry battalions, reinforces the SBCT reconnaissance squadron and provides long-range direct fire. Models with the double V-hull upgrade are known as the M1253 ATVV.

General
The M1134 Stryker ATGM Vehicle is part of a family of eight-wheeled armored fighting vehicles derived from the Canadian LAV III. Stryker vehicles are produced by General Dynamics Land Systems for the United States Army. The ATGM Vehicle provides an anti-armor overwatch capability that allows the Stryker Brigade Combat Team (SBCT) to concentrate on the use of M1126 infantry carrier vehicles to deploy soldiers in a manner that is relatively fast and protected. It is the primary tank destroyer of the SBCT, capable of defeating many armored threats up to 4 km away using the TOW missile system. The ATGM Vehicle provides standoff for the SBCT by use of its SACLOS guided missiles, which are effective at ranges equal to or exceeding those of most cannons, autocannons, or small arms. It has 4-wheel drive (8×4) and can be switched to all-wheel drive (8×8).

The ATGM Vehicles are primarily operated by an independent Infantry company assigned to each of the Stryker brigades.  In the 2nd and 3rd Stryker Cavalry Regiments, O Troop is part of the Regimental RSTA Squadron.
 51st Infantry Regiment
 F Company: 1st Brigade, 1st Armored Division
 52nd Infantry Regiment
 A Company: 2nd Brigade, 2nd Infantry Division
 B Company: 2nd Brigade, 25th Infantry Division
 Hellcat Troop: 1st Brigade, 2nd Infantry Division
 D Company: 1st Brigade, 25th Infantry Division
 F Company: 4th Brigade, 2nd Infantry Division
 2/104th Cavalry Regiment
 D Troop: 56th Brigade, 28th Infantry Division, Pennsylvania Army National Guard

Operational capability
The M1134 ATGM Vehicle is based on the infantry carrier platform due to the close parallels of operational requirements and battlefield capabilities between the two systems. The M1134 is an organic vehicle to the ICV maneuver formation and helps maximize commonality of the platform while simultaneously reducing the maintenance footprint and variety of logistics support.

The ATGM MAV's purpose is to provide the brigade's main tank killing capability firing heavy anti-tank missiles to defeat enemy armored vehicles at range before the enemy tanks can return fire. The intention is that the brigade's separate anti-tank company, equipped with the M1134, will reinforce the brigade's infantry battalions, form part of the brigade reserve,  reinforce the brigade reconnaissance squadron in counter-reconnaissance action, and to counterattack the enemy's. This dedicated ATGM Vehicle allows the remainder of the brigade's MAV fleet to be optimized for specific capabilities that can function under the anti-tank overwatch umbrella.

Of the 300 Stryker vehicles in a Stryker Brigade Combat Team, nine are M1134 anti-tank vehicles.

As of May 2017, a Stryker Brigade Combat Team is equipped with three platoons of Mobile Gun System Strykers and three platoons of ATGM Strykers in its weapons troop.

See also 
 MGM-166 LOSAT, a canceled U.S. Army line-of-sight missile
 M1128 Mobile Gun System, Stryker assault vehicle retired in 2022
 XM1219 Armed Robotic Vehicle, a U.S. Army Future Combat Systems unmanned ground combat vehicle canceled in 2011
 XM1202 Mounted Combat System, a U.S. Army tank canceled in 2011 that was part of the Future Combat Systems Manned Ground Vehicles program
 M8 Armored Gun System, a U.S. Army light tank acquisition program canceled in 1996
 Mobile Protected Firepower, an ongoing U.S. Army light tank acquisition program

References

Further reading
M1134 Stryker Anti-Tank Missile Carrier | Military-Today.com

External links

Armored personnel carriers of the United States
Post–Cold War armored fighting vehicles of the United States
General Dynamics land vehicles
Wheeled self-propelled rocket launchers
Military vehicles introduced in the 2000s
Mowag Piranha